The Washburne Historic District in Springfield, Oregon was established in 1985 and added to the National Register of Historic Places (NRHP) in 1987. The district includes 29 full blocks and five partial blocks, and it is roughly bounded by A Street on the south, G Street on the north, Pioneer Parkway on the west, and 10th Street on the east. Its total area encompasses 84 acres.

Springfield General Hospital, now an apartment building within the district,  is individually listed on the NRHP.

History

Named for banker and flour mill owner C.W. Washburne, the Washburne Historic District is part of an 1852 Donation Land Claim by Springfield founder Elias Briggs. The grid style blocks were platted from surveys between 1872 and 1890. Nearly 44 percent of surviving structures were completed between 1890 and 1915. Most of the district included paved streets and sidewalks by the mid-1920s.

Classification of buildings
The district includes five classes of buildings:
 Primary significant: built 1890 - 1915, 136 structures
 Secondary significant: built 1916 - 1930, 98 structures
 Compatible/contributing: built 1930 - 1940, 12 structures
 Compatible/non-contributing: 
built after 1940 and consistent with the character of the district
built 1890 - 1940 but substantially altered by renovation, 80 total
Intrusion/non-contributing: non-historic structures irrelevant to the building traditions in the district, 9 structures

References

Further reading
 List of Washburne Historic District walking tour houses
 National Register of Historic Places listings in Lane County, Oregon

National Register of Historic Places in Lane County, Oregon
Historic districts on the National Register of Historic Places in Oregon
Geography of Lane County, Oregon
Springfield, Oregon
1987 establishments in Oregon